Tilt was a Finnish video games magazine published 10 times a year by Yhtyneet kuvalehdet OY. In the Finnish gaming magazine scene Tilt was a newcomer, challenging mainly the well-established Pelit magazine with another newcomer, Pelaaja. Tilt covered both PC and consoles.

Tilt leveraged the brand of similarly named Finnish TV show hosted by Anna-Maija Jalkanen, although the magazine was targeted for a more mature audience.

Tilt magazine lasted in the market for about a year. The publishing company pulled the plug and the magazine was quietly discontinued.

See also
 List of magazines in Finland
 Tilt.tv
 Pelaaja
 Pelit

External links
 https://web.archive.org/web/20040814023318/http://www.tilt.tv/
 http://www.tiltlehti.fi/

2004 establishments in Finland
2005 disestablishments in Finland
Computer magazines published in Finland
Defunct computer magazines
Defunct magazines published in Finland
Magazines established in 2004
Magazines disestablished in 2005
Ten times annually magazines
Video game magazines published in Finland